The Arboreto di Arco (1 hectare) is an arboretum and botanical garden located at Viale delle Palme, 1, Arco, Trentino, Italy. It is open daily without charge.

The arboretum was created in 1872 by Archduke Albert, Duke of Teschen, on the grounds of his villa, not far from Lake Garda. It was renovated in 1964 as miniature landscapes, reconstructing natural plant environments, and in 1993 became part of the Museo Tridentino di Scienze Naturali. Today the arboretum contains about 150 species of plants from around the world, each labeled with Latin binomial, family, common name, and area of origin.

See also 
 List of botanical gardens in Italy

References 
 Museo tridentino di scienze naturali - Arboreto di Arco
 Horti entry (Italian)
 Tiscover description (Italian)
 W. Larcher, "Winterfrostschäden in den Parks und Gärten von Arco und Riva am Gardasee", Veröff. Museum Ferdinandeum Innsbruck n.43, pages 153–199, 1963.
 F. Tisi, "Note sull'Arboreto di Arco", in Atti riunione scientifica sul tema "Didattica preuniversitaria negli Orti Botanici", Arco e Trento, 1994; Inform. Bot. Ital., 28(1), pages 144–146, 1996.

Botanical gardens in Italy
Gardens in Trentino-Alto Adige/Südtirol